"But It Rained" is a major hit from the popular Indian rock band, Parikrama. The song is inspired by kidnappings in the Kashmir valley, specifically an article published in a magazine about relatives of kidnapped people waiting with hope for them to return, even as many months have passed without any trace of them.

External links
http://www.parikrama.com/bir/story.html The full story behind the song at Parikrama's official website.

1996 singles
1996 songs
Song articles with missing songwriters